Giovanni Emo (1565–1622) was a Roman Catholic prelate who served as Bishop of Bergamo (1611–1622).

Biography
Giovanni Emo was born in Venice, Italy.
On 18 Apr 1611, he was appointed during the papacy of Pope Paul V as Bishop of Bergamo.
On 24 May 1611, he was consecrated bishop by Giovanni Delfino, Cardinal-Priest of San Marco, with Marco Cornaro, Bishop of Padua, and Luca Stella, Bishop of Rethymo, serving as co-consecrators. 
He served as Bishop of Bergamo until his death on 16 Oct 1622.

References

External links and additional sources
 (for Chronology of Bishops) 
 (for Chronology of Bishops) 

17th-century Roman Catholic bishops in the Republic of Venice
Bishops appointed by Pope Paul V
1565 births
1622 deaths